Petronella "Nel" Phillemina Johanna van Randwijk (14 September 1905 – 21 September 1978) was a Dutch gymnast. She won the gold medal as member of the Dutch gymnastics team at the 1928 Summer Olympics in Amsterdam. She was born in Utrecht and died in The Hague.

References
 profile

1905 births
1978 deaths
Dutch female artistic gymnasts
Gymnasts at the 1928 Summer Olympics
Olympic gold medalists for the Netherlands
Olympic gymnasts of the Netherlands
Olympic medalists in gymnastics
Sportspeople from Utrecht (city)
Medalists at the 1928 Summer Olympics
20th-century Dutch women
20th-century Dutch people